The 1992–93 Michigan Wolverines men's basketball team represented the University of Michigan in intercollegiate college basketball during the 1992–93 season. The team played its home games in the Crisler Arena in Ann Arbor, Michigan, and was a member of the Big Ten Conference.  Under the direction of head coach Steve Fisher, the team finished second in the Big Ten Conference. Although the team compiled a 31–5 record during the season, the National Collegiate Athletic Association has adjusted the team's record to 0-4 due to the University of Michigan basketball scandal.  The team earned an invitation to the 1993 NCAA Division I men's basketball tournament where it was national runner up. The team was ranked for the entire eighteen weeks of Associated Press Top Twenty-Five Poll, starting the season ranked first, holding the number one position for three weeks and ending ranked third, and it ended the season ranked fourth in the final USA Today/CNN Poll.  The team had an 8–5 record against ranked opponents, including the following victories: December 28, 1992, against #20 Nebraska 88–73 in the Rainbow Classic at the Blaisdell Center, December 29 against #5 North Carolina 79–78 in the Rainbow Classic, December 30 against #2 Kansas 86–74 in the Rainbow Classic, January 7, 1993, against #9 Purdue 80–70 at Mackey Arena, February 2 against #25 Michigan State 73–69 at the Breslin Student Events Center, February 7 against #19 Purdue 84–76 at Crisler Arena, March 2 against #15 Iowa 82–73 at Crisler Arena, April 2 against #2 Kentucky 81–78 (OT) at the Superdome in the 1993 NCAA Division I men's basketball tournament.

The team had rotating captains on a game-by-game basis, and Chris Webber earned team MVP.  The team's leading scorers were Chris Webber (690 points), Jalen Rose (555 points), and Juwan Howard (524 points).  The leading rebounders were Webber (362), Howard (267), and Eric Riley (169).

During the season the team set a Big Ten Conference record for single-season blocked shots (193) that would last until 2000.

During the season, the team won the Big Ten Conference statistical championships in rebounding and rebounding margin with at 40.9 average and 7.6 average margin in conference games, respectively.  The record-setting team also led the conference in average blocked shots (5.0). Chris Webber led the Big Ten in rebounds with a 9.7 average in 18 conference games and 10.1 average in 36 overall games.

The team surpassed the 30-win total by the 1989 team with 31 victories and was the winningest team in school history, until being matched by Michigan's 2012–13 team and later being surpassed by its 2017–18 team.

For the second year in a row, the team set the school record for single-season team blocks with 193 in 36 games, surpassing the 182 in 34 games set the prior year.  The record would stand until 2007.

Four players surpassed Jalen Rose's single-season minutes played record set the prior season.  Rose set the new and current single-season record of 1234.  King played 1174 minutes, while Webber and Howard contributed 1138 and 1135, respectively.

Regular season
Michigan returned its top nine scorers and began the season ranked number one in the country by the Associated Press.  Michigan lost its second game of the season in a rematch with Duke.

Schedule

|-
!colspan="12" style="background:#; color:#;"| Non-conference Regular season

|-
!colspan="12" style="background:#; color:#;"| Big Ten Regular season

|-
!colspan="12" style="background:#; color:#;"| NCAA Tournament

NCAA tournament
Michigan was given the #1 seed in that year's West Regional and played their first and second-round games at the McKale Center in Tucson. They defeated Coastal Carolina in their first game and then were taken to overtime by #9 seed UCLA before escaping with a victory.

The Wolverines moved on to the Kingdome for the regionals. The sub-regional had been littered with upsets, as the #12, #13, and #15 seeds had all won in the first round. Michigan drew #12 seeded George Washington and won, then faced Temple for the second consecutive year (having defeated them as a #6 seed the year before) and beating them 77–72 to join Kentucky, Kansas, and North Carolina in the Final Four in New Orleans.
In their national semifinal at the Superdome on April 3, the team defeated Southeast Regional winner Kentucky 81–78 in overtime.

In the championship game at the Superdome on April 5, the Wolverines lost to East Regional winner North Carolina 77–71. Michigan's final possession of the game went down as one of the most memorable moments in college basketball history. With twenty seconds to go and Michigan trailing by two and out of timeouts, Chris Webber rebounded a missed free throw. Confused as to what to do next, Webber thought about passing to Jalen Rose but did not and took a step without dribbling the basketball. The officials did not see the travel, however, and Webber headed upcourt where North Carolina was set up in a half court trap defense. Webber ran directly into the trap and was double teamed in the corner. He could not break the double team to pass the ball, and called for a timeout that the Wolverines did not have. By rule, Michigan was given a technical foul for calling the extra timeout and North Carolina was given two free throws and possession of the ball. North Carolina made their free throws, then added two more when Michigan was forced to foul again after the change in possession.

The team established numerous NCAA records for three-point field goals in the final four: fewest single-game three-point field goals made in a final four (0 vs. Kentucky on April 3, 1993, in an overtime) and fewest single-game three-point field goals attempted (4 vs. Kentucky).  The 0 three-point field goals made surpassed the team's previous record of 1 made against Duke the year before in the 1992 NCAA Division I men's basketball tournament.

Later developments
In 2002, the Wolverines vacated their entire 1992–93 season, including their tournament appearance, in the wake of a major scandal involving many years of improper payments from a major booster to several former players, among them Webber.

Statistics
The team posted the following statistics:

 * Denotes players whose individual records, awards and other honors have been vacated due to NCAA and U-M sanctions

Rankings

Awards and honors
 Chris Webber, All-America selection (vacated as a result of the scandal)
 Rob Pelinka, Walter Byers Scholar (top male scholar-athlete in all NCAA sports; not vacated)

Team players drafted into the NBA
Five players from this team were selected in the NBA draft.

See also
1993 NCAA Division I men's basketball tournament
List of vacated and forfeited games in college basketball
University of Michigan basketball scandal

References

Michigan Wolverines men's basketball seasons
Michigan
NCAA Division I men's basketball tournament Final Four seasons
Michigan
Michigan
Michigan